Port-Royal is a French railway station on the RER B line in Paris. It is located in the 5th arrondissement, not far from its tripoint border with the 6th and 14th arrondissements. It is named after Port-Royal Abbey, Paris.

History
The station opened on 31 March 1895, as part of the Compagnie du chemin de fer de Paris à Orléans extension of the Ligne de Sceaux from Denfert-Rochereau station north to Luxembourg station.

The station has a unique architectural style with the station house located above the tracks on a metal footbridge. This particular arrangement was necessary because of a lack of space at the station site. Today, the station house retains its original appearance with its platforms protected by glass canopies, but the ends of the platforms have been extended to accommodate longer trains.

Port-Royal station was targeted in the 3 December 1996 Paris RER bombing when an explosive device detonated on the southbound tracks of the station. Four people were killed in the attack.

Gallery

See also
 List of stations of the Paris RER

References

Réseau Express Régional stations
Railway stations in France opened in 1895
Buildings and structures in the 5th arrondissement of Paris
Buildings and structures in the 6th arrondissement of Paris